The list of marine molluscs of Angola is a list of marine species that form a part of the molluscan fauna of Angola. This list does not include the land or freshwater molluscs.

Gastropoda

Families and species of marine gastropods of the Angolan fauna include:

Family Acteonidae

Acteon tornatilis

Family Architectonicidae

Architectonica perspectiva
Architectonica granulatum

Family Buccinidae

Cantharus viverratus
Phos grateloupianus
Pisania d'orbignyi

Family Bullidae

Bulla striata
Bulla adansoni

Family Bursidae

Bufonaria marginata
Bursa pustulosa

Family Calyptraeidae

Calyptraea chinensis
Calyptraea trochiformis
Crepidula porcellana

Family Cancellariidae

Bivetiella similis
Cancellaria cancellata

Family Cassidae

Cassis spinosa

Family Cerithiidae

Cerithium atratum

Family Columbellidae

Columbella rustica

Family Conidae

Conus adamsonii
Conus ambiguus
Conus ermineus
Conus genuanus
Conus mediterraneus
Conus mercator
Conus pulcher
Conus striatellus
Conus zebra
Genota mitraeformis
Glyphostoma candida

Family Cypraeidae

Cypraea lurida
Cypraea picta
Cypraea pyrum
Cypraea rattus
Cypraea sanguinolenta
Cypraea stercoraria

Family Fasciolariidae

Fusinus albinus
Latirus armatus
Latirus filosus

Family Fissurellidae

 Fissurella coarctata
 Fissurella nubercula
 Fissurella tarnieri
 Diodora menkeana

Family Harpidae

Harpa rosea

Family Janthinidae

Janthina janthina

Family Littorinidae

Littorina cingulifera
Littorina punctata
Littorina angulifera

Family Marginellidae

Marginella glabella

Family Melongenidae

Pugilina morio

Family Mitridae

Imbricaria carbonacea
Mitra fusca

Family Muricidae

Bolinus cornutus
Hexaplex fulvescens
Hexaplex varius
Hexaplex duplex duplex
Purpurellus pinniger
Stramonita haemastoma
Thais coronata
Thais forbesi

Family Nassariidae

Bullia callosa
Bullia miran
Cyllene lyrata

Family Neritidae

Nerita senegalensis

Family Naticidae

Natica adansoni
Natica collaria
Natica cruentata
Natica flammulata
Natica fulminea
Natica fusca
Natica gruveli
Natica marochiensis
Natica michaelis
Natica rocquignyi
Natica turtoni
Natica variabilis
Natica vittata
Polinices lacteus
Polinices grossularia
Sigaretus concavus
Sigaretus bifasciatus

Family Olividae

Agaronia acuminata
Oliva flammulata
Oliva reticularis
Olivancillaria nana
Olivella pulchella

Family Patellidae

Patella intermedia
Patella safiana
Patella natalensis

Family Pyramidellidae

Pyramidella dolabrata

Family Ranellidae

Cymatium (Septa) trigonum
Distortrix ridens

Family Terebridae

Acus senegalensis
Hastula lepida
Impages aciculina

Family Tonnidae

Tonna galea

Family Trochidae

Gibbula magus
Clanculus villanus
Clanculus guineensis
Clanculus granoliratus

Family Turridae

Clavatula muricata
Clavatula rubrifasciata
Clavatula spirata
Perrona lineata 
Turris pluteata
Turris undatiruga

Family Turritellidae

Turritella britanica
Turritella bicingulata
Turritella praetermissa

Family Volutidae

Cymbium gracile
Cymbium olla

Family Xenophoridae

Xenophora senegalensis

Bivalvia

Families and species of marine bivalves of the Angolan fauna include:

Family Anomiidae

Anomia ephippium

Family Arcidae

Arca noe
Senilia senilis

Family Cardiidae

Cardium costatum
Cardium ringens

Family Carditidae

Beguina senegalensis
Cardita lacunosa

Family Chamidae

Chama crenulata
Chama gryphina

Family Crassatellidae

Crassatella divaricata

Family Donacidae

Donax rugosus
Donax serra
Iphigenia rostrata
Iphigenia laevigata

Family Limidae

Limaria tuberculata

Family Mactridae

Mactra glabrata
Mactra largillierti
Mactra nitida

Family Mytilidae

Mytilus perna

Family Pectinidae

Flexopecten glaber
Pecten flabellum

Family Petricolidae

Petricola lajonkairii
Petricola pholadiformis

Family Pharidae

Sinupharus africanus

Family Pholadidae

Pholas campechiensis

Family Pinnidae

Pinna rudis
Pinna ramulosa

Family Psammobiidae

Sanguinolaria sanguinolenta
Solecurtus strigilatus
Tagelus angulatus

Family Pteriidae

Pteria atlantica

Family Solenidae

Solen marginatus
Solen guineensis

Family Tellinidae

Tellina madagascariensis

Family Veneridae

Chione paphia
Irus irus
Pitar floridella
Tivela bicolor
Venus rosalina
Venus foliacea
Venerupis senegalensis
Venerupis dura

References

 Marine moll

M
Angola